Selliera is a genus of herbs in the family Goodeniaceae.

Species
 Selliera exigua F.Muell. 
 Selliera fasciculata Buchanan 
 Selliera herpystica Schltdl. 
 Selliera koningsbergeri Backer 
 Selliera microphylla Colenso 
 Selliera radicans Cav. 
 Selliera repens (Labill.) de Vriese 
 Selliera rotundifolia Heenan

References

Goodeniaceae
Asterales genera